The Djiboutian records in swimming are the fastest ever performances of swimmers from Djibouti, which are recognised and ratified by the Fédération Djiboutienne de Natation.

All records were set in finals unless noted otherwise.

Long Course (50 m)

Men

Women

Short Course (25 m)

Men

Women

References

Djibouti
Records
Swimming